Gwadar International Airport  (Balochi:  بالی پٹ گوادر) is an international airport situated 14 km (9 miles) north of the city centre of Gwadar, in the Balochistan province of Pakistan.

History
In 1958, the town of Gwadar was purchased by Government of Pakistan from the Sultan of Muscat. Air operations started in 1966. The airport gained international status when two weekly flights from Karachi to Muscat via Gwadar were initiated with Fokker F-27 aircraft. The terminal building was inaugurated in 1984 and new departure/VIP lounges opened in 2008.

The current airport caters mainly to the population of Gwadar. Pakistan International Airlines, the main airline flying out of the airport, connects Gwadar to Karachi, Turbat, Quetta, Peshawar, Islamabad, Lahore, Dubai, Doha, Kuwait City, Riyadh, Tehran, Mashhad, Bahrain and Muscat. Other airlines had recently launched their flights to Gwadar and currently had been doing pretty well due to successful  performance. These included Oman Air, which flew to Muscat using ATR 42 aircraft, and airblue, which started twice daily flights to Karachi through its joint venture partner JS Air.

Structure 
Apron
Four narrow body aircraft can park at the apron at one time. Every type of jet can land here.
Lounges
One domestic and one International lounge.
One CIP/VIP lounge for premium and executive passengers. (newly inaugurated in 2008)
Additional
Facility for prayer available; separate for ladies and gents.
Fire services, NDB, standby generators are available.
24-hour priority notice for unexpected arrival into the airport.

Airlines and destinations

New Gwadar International Airport 

The New Gwadar International Airport (NGIA) is being built and will be country's biggest when completed in September 2023, although a soft opening and a test flight is scheduled for 23 March 2023 when it is expected to be inaugurated by the Chinese President Xi. Occupying 4,300 acres (17 km2) of land, it is located in Gurandani, 26 km north-east of the existing airport in Gwadar City on the south-western Arabian Sea coast of Balochistan region. NGIA is expected to cost $246 million. It is fully funded by China as a grant.

PM Imran Khan had laid down the foundation stone for NGIA on 29 March 2019. This greenfield airport will include a modern terminal building alongside a cargo terminal, with refrigeration facilities for perishable items, with an initial handling capacity of 30,000 tonnes a year. NGIA will have the capacity to accommodate wide body aircraft including Airbus A380 & Boeing 747-8 and including narrow body aircraft such as ATR-72 & Boeing 737-900ER.

It will have a single runway with 3,658 metres of length and a width of 75 metres that will have the capacity to accommodate wide bodied aircraft. A taxiway of 23 metres length alongside a 10.5 metre paved shoulders for both sides. The airport will also have the capacity to build the second runway in the north direction of the first runway. An Air Traffic Control (ATC) Tower, crash, fire and rescue facilities will be built as well as a fuel farm.

The Civil Aviation Authority had awarded the design to build contract of the new airport to the China Communications Construction Company (CCC), which is expected to be completed in March 2023.

The New Gwadar International Airport will be constructed at a cost of Rs55.4 billion.

See also 
 List of airports in Pakistan
 Airlines of Pakistan
 Transport in Pakistan
 Pakistan Civil Aviation Authority

References

External links 
 CAA Gwadar International Airport
 CAA Pakistan – official site
 
 

Airports in Balochistan, Pakistan
International airports in Pakistan
Gwadar District
China–Pakistan Economic Corridor